Loop Synagogue is a synagogue in the Chicago Loop, built in 1957–1958. It is renowned for a stained glass artwork by Abraham Rattner.

The architects were the firm Loebl, Schlossman & Bennett, who also designed the Richard J. Daley Center.

Artwork
A sculpture Hands of Peace by Nehemia Azaz is situated over the entrance doors. The work depicts "priestly hands raised in benediction" (the Priestly Blessing).

Let There Be Light
Abraham Rattner's  Let There Be Light  occupies the entire eastern wall of the second-floor sanctuary. It stands in juxtaposition to the "reserved minimalism" of the rest of the interior. The art depicts images from Genesis 1:3 and Jewish religious symbols including a menorah, a shofar and an etrog. Additional influences include kabbalistic symbolism of "the force and the spirit of the ineffable and unknowable power".

It was described as "[p]erhaps the most beautiful synagogue interior in the United States". Another critic said the glass "bathes the sanctuary in a shower of color, artistically consecrating the space as a place apart from the grey concrete scene on the other side of the glass".

Notes

References

Sources

Further reading

External links

Buildings: Chicago Loop Synagogue PBS (video clip)

Orthodox Judaism in Chicago
Synagogues completed in 1958
Synagogues in Chicago